Stefano Rosso (born Stefano Rossi; December 7, 1948 – September 15, 2008) was an Italian singer-songwriter and guitarist.

Background
Born in Rome, Rosso debuted in 1969 with his brother in the duo "Romolo e Remo", with the song "Io vagabondo". Become a solo artist, he obtained his first commercial success with the 1976 song "Una storia disonesta". In 1980, he took part at the Sanremo Music Festival with the song "L'italiano". 
After a more difficult period, Rosso had returned to popularity in 2005 with the version of "Una storia disonesta" recorded by Tonino Carotone.

Personal life
From Rosso's relationship with TG3 journalist Teresa Piazza, he was the father of the rapper Jesto. He also has a daughter, Stefania, from another relationship.

Discography 
Albums
      1977 – Una storia disonesta (RCA Italiana, PL 31237)
     1978 – ...e allora senti cosa fò (RCA Italiana, PL 31333)
     1979 – Bioradiofotografie (RCA Italiana, PL 31450)
     1980 – Io e il sig. Rosso (Ciao Records, 1002)
     1981 – Vado, prendo l'America...e torno! (Lupus, LULP 14903)
     1982 – Donne (Lupus, LULP 14912)
     1983 – La chitarra fingerpicking di Stefano Rosso (Lupus, LULM 25004)
     1985 – Stefano Rosso (Polydor, 825 768-1)
     1989 – Femminando (Interbeat, 22924 6356-1) 
     1997 – Miracolo italiano (RCA/BMG, 74321 4 79772 3 )
     2001 – Il meglio (Duck Records)
     2003 – Fingerstyle Guitar (Red & Black Music, G 001)
     2003 – Live at the Folk Studio (Red & Black Music, LIVE 001)
     2003 – Live at the station (Red & Black Music, LIVE 002)
     2004 – Banjoman (Red & Black Music, SG 001)
     2006 – Lullaby of birdland (Red & Black Music, GT 002)
     2007 – Mortacci (Red & Black Music, SG 002/0001)
     2008 – Piccolo mondo antico (Red & Black Music)

References

External links 
 Stefano Rosso at Discogs

1948 births
2008 deaths
Singers from Rome
Italian male singer-songwriters
Italian male guitarists
20th-century Italian male singers
21st-century Italian male singers
20th-century Italian guitarists
21st-century Italian guitarists